Union is a town in rural Greene County, Alabama, United States. Per the 2020 census, the population was 180. According to the 1980 U.S. Census, it was incorporated in the 1970s.

Geography
Union is located in northern Greene County at  (32.994164, -87.905313).

Demographics

2020 census

Note: the US Census treats Hispanic/Latino as an ethnic category. This table excludes Latinos from the racial categories and assigns them to a separate category. Hispanics/Latinos can be of any race.

2000 Census
As of the census of 2000, there were 227 people, 85 households, and 53 families residing in the town. The racial makeup of the town was 7.93% White and 92.07% Black or African American.

There were 85 households, out of which 32.9% had children under the age of 18 living with them, 41.2% were married couples living together, 18.8% had a female householder with no husband present, and 37.6% were non-families. 35.3% of all households were made up of individuals, and 10.6% had someone living alone who was 65 years of age or older. The average household size was 2.67 and the average family size was 3.58.

In the town, the population was spread out, with 27.8% under the age of 18, 11.5% from 18 to 24, 27.3% from 25 to 44, 21.6% from 45 to 64, and 11.9% who were 65 years of age or older. The median age was 37 years. For every 100 females, there were 106.4 males. For every 100 females age 18 and over, there were 92.9 males.

The median income for a household in the town was $22,031, and the median income for a family was $28,125. Males had a median income of $30,625 versus $17,083 for females. The per capita income for the town was $10,842. About 36.4% of families and 32.6% of the population were below the poverty line, including 42.5% of those under the age of eighteen and 60.0% of those 65 or over.

References 

Towns in Greene County, Alabama
Towns in Alabama
Tuscaloosa, Alabama metropolitan area